Feshtam (also Romanized as Feshtām; also known as Feshtām-e Bālā Maḩalleh) is a village in Eslamabad Rural District, Sangar District, Rasht County, Gilan Province, Iran. At the 2006 census, its population was 387, in 104 families.

References 

Populated places in Rasht County